Georg Lammers (14 April 1905 – 17 March 1987) was a German sprinter who competed at the 1928 Summer Olympics. He won a silver medal in the 4 × 100 m relay, together with Richard Corts, Hubert Houben and Helmut Körnig, and a bronze in the individual 100 m event.

During his career Lammers won eight national titles and set 13 world records. After retiring from competitions he worked as a bank clerk, then as a policeman and finally as a superintendent. He was one of the founders of the “Vereinigung alter Leichtathleten” (Association of Former Athletes) and of police sport in Germany after World War II. His daughter Senta competed in sprint at the national level.

References

1905 births
1987 deaths
People from Wesermarsch
German male sprinters
Olympic silver medalists for Germany
Olympic bronze medalists for Germany
People from Oldenburg (state)
Athletes (track and field) at the 1928 Summer Olympics
Olympic athletes of Germany
Medalists at the 1928 Summer Olympics
Olympic silver medalists in athletics (track and field)
Olympic bronze medalists in athletics (track and field)
Sportspeople from Lower Saxony